Boeing Aircraft Holding Company (BAHC) is a wholly owned subsidiary of Boeing. This company manages Boeing-owned, used aircraft, including planes acquired due to a trade-in or a lease return. It has a mailing address in Seattle, Washington, near the headquarters for Boeing Commercial Airplanes, but the point of location is listed as Delaware.

As of 2005, BAHC has a fleet of 15 aircraft, including 10 Boeing 747s and 4 McDonnell Douglas MD-80s. They also have 8 planes in storage and 7 have been scrapped. Surprisingly, considering the sometimes heated rivalry between Boeing and Airbus, this company has also sold a number of Airbus A310 and A340 aircraft. Many of these airframes are traded in for Boeing products, such as Singapore Airlines trading A340-300s for new Boeing 777-200ERs. The A340-300s were then transferred by Boeing to customers such as Emirates Airline.

References

External links
 Fleet Overview on PlaneSpotters.net

Boeing